C. Clarke may refer to:

 C. Clarke (1837 English cricketer), English cricketer
 C. Clarke (Sheffield cricketer), English cricketer

See also
Clarke#People with the surname